Springdale is an old rural community of Brampton, Ontario, Canada  covering  in the northern part of the city. It is generally bounded by Countryside Drive to the north, Bovaird Drive to the south, Heart Lake Road to the west, and Airport Road to the east. Springdale is sometimes referred to Singhdale due to its large population of Sikh Canadians, who make up 39.6% of the community's population and often have the last name Singh.

History

The present-day area of Springdale was located in the northeast part of the southern half of Chinguacousy Township before the township was amalgamated into the city of Brampton in 1974. 

The eastern part of present-day Springdale along Airport Road was the site of the hamlet of Stanley’s Mills, established in 1820. By 1860, the hamlet, characterized by an important milling industry, consisted of "three mills, a wagon shop, a blacksmith, tailor, seamstress, inn, store, post office, and Methodist church." The sole remaining vestige of the hamlet is the designated heritage site at 10416 Airport Road, a Gothic revival brick residence built circa 1860 and associated with the Alderson family, among Brampton’s earliest settlers. The Aldersons operated a mill in the 1860s and 1870s on the creek to the south of the present house.

Two other designated heritage sites are along Torbram Road and reflect the area’s rural and agricultural past. The Elliott Farmhouse, of a vernacular Ontario Gothic style, was built about 1865. The Elliott Homestead, of a Gothic Revival style, was built in 1876 and is linked to the former Harrison Methodist Church a kilometre south.  

Springdale as the suburban community it is today was planned in the 1980s, and construction began in 1991. The $5 billion “town within a city,” planned to be completed around 2005, would house 75,000 people in 22,000 homes on a 4,000-acre site. The project was said to include "a hospital, 17 churches [and places of worship], 13 public and nine separate schools, a public library, two fire stations, a police station, a public transit terminal, 45 community parks, a large regional shopping centre, 18 plazas, and three low-rise office complexes," as well as over 700 acres of park space or open green space and 120 kilometres of paved bike paths. As part of the "green" focus for Springdale, developers also gave the community’s eight different neighbourhoods a distinct geographical theme, such as mountains, tundra, grasslands, forests, deserts, and so on, and named the streets to reflect that particular environment.

Politics
Springdale is split in federal and provincial representation between Brampton North and Brampton East. Brampton North covers the area west of Torbram Road, south of Sandalwood Parkway; and west of Bramalea Road, north of Sandalwood Parkway. Brampton East covers the area east of those lines.

Infrastructure

Brampton Civic Hospital, opened in 2007, is located in the area, along with two fire stations and a paramedic station.

Trinity Common Mall is a large shopping plaza in the area and includes a Cineplex movie theatre and transit terminal.

Recreation
The Save Max Sports Centre, formerly Brampton Soccer Centre, opened in 2007.

The Springdale branch of the Brampton Library opened in 2018.

Demographics

According to the 2016 Census, the top six mother tongues in the L6R forward sortation area (which is largely the area of Springdale) are English (36.3%), Punjabi (34.4%), Gujarati (3.6%), Urdu (2.8%), Tamil (2.6%), and Hindi (2.5%).  

Immigrants make up 59.7% of residents in the area, compared to 52.3% for the city. Among the immigrant population, the top six places of birth are India (55.8%), Jamaica (6.6%), Guyana (4.9%), Pakistan (4.3%), Sri Lanka (4.3%), and the Philippines (3%).

Education
There are numerous elementary and middle schools, and four secondary schools in the area.

Peel District School Board
Elementary and middle schools

Carberry Public School
Eagle Plains Public School 
Fernforest Public School
Great Lakes Public School
Hewson Public School
Larkspur Public School 
Lougheed Middle School
Mountain Ash Public School  
Robert J. Lee Public School
Shaw Public School
Springdale Public School
Stanley Mills Public School
Sunny View Middle School

Secondary schools

Harold M. Brathwaite Secondary School  
Louise Arbour Secondary School
Sandalwood Heights Secondary School

Dufferin-Peel Catholic District School Board

Blessed Michael J. McGivney Catholic School
Father Clair Tipping School
Good Shepherd Elementary School
Our Lady of Providence School
St. Isaac Jogues Elementary School
St. Marguerite d'Youville Secondary School

Notable people
Ayo Akinola - professional soccer player
Anthony Bennett - professional basketball player
Nakas Onyeka - professional Canadian football player
Tristan Thompson - professional basketball player

References

Neighbourhoods in Brampton
Ethnic enclaves in Canada
Little Indias
Sikh enclaves